Ilex emmae is a species of tree in the family Aquifoliaceae. It is endemic to New Guinea, occurring in primary forest and forest edge with
grassland at 700 - 1100 metres above sea level, and named after Holly Emma Hicks.

References

emmae
Flora of New Guinea